Thanga Rangan is a 1978 Indian Tamil-language film written and directed by S. R. Dakshinamurthy. The film stars Thengai Srinivasan, Vijayakumar and Srividya. It was released on 30 October 1978.

Plot 

Rangan is a rickshaw puller. His brother-in-law Kesavulu molests his lover.

Cast 
 Thengai Srinivasan
 Vijayakumar
 Srividya
 Shubha
 Prameela

Soundtrack 
The soundtrack was composed by M. S. Viswanathan, while the lyrics were written by Kannadasan, N. Kamarajan and Muthulingam. The playback singers were T. M. Soundararajan, T. K. Kala, Jayachandran, P. Susheela and Kovai Soundararajan. The songs in the film were "Irattai Ilai", "Dhupariya Porom","Udhadugalil" and "Engarangan Thangarangan".

Release 
Thanga Rangan was released on 30 October 1978, Diwali day. P. S. M. of Kalki said the film could be watched for the performances of Srinivasan and Srividya.

References

External links 
 

1970s Tamil-language films
Films scored by M. S. Viswanathan